SN Refsdal is the first detected multiply-lensed supernova, visible within the field of the galaxy cluster MACS J1149+2223. It was given its nickname in honor of the Norwegian astrophysicist Sjur Refsdal, who, in 1964, first proposed using time-delayed images from a lensed supernova to study the expansion of the universe. The observations were made using the Hubble Space Telescope.

Einstein cross
The host galaxy of SN Refsdal is at a redshift of 1.49, corresponding to a comoving distance of 14.4 billion light-years and a lookback time of 9.34 billion years. The multiple images are arranged around the elliptical galaxy at z = 0.54 in a cross-shaped pattern, also known as an "Einstein cross".

Reappearance

After the discovery of the Refsdal Supernova, astronomers predicted that they would have the rare opportunity to see the supernova again in about one year, after the four images had faded away. This is because the initially observed four-image pattern was only one component of the lensing display. The supernova may have appeared as a single image some 40–50 years ago elsewhere in the cluster field.

The supernova Refsdal reappeared punctually at the predicted position between mid-November 2015 and December 11, 2015 (with the exact date being uncertain by approximately one month which is the interval between two consecutive Hubble observations), in excellent agreement with the blind model predictions made before the reappearance was observed.
The time delay between the original quadruplet observed in 2014 and the latest appearance of the supernova in 2015 was used to infer the value of the Hubble constant. This is the first time this technique, originally suggested by Refsdal, has been applied to supernovae.

See also 
 Einstein Cross, the gravitationally lensed quasar that gave rise to the term "Einstein cross"
 Gravitational lens, the phenomena that creates visual patterns such as an Einstein cross
 MACS J1149 Lensed Star 1 (or Icarus) – most distant star detected (April, 2018)
 WHL0137-LS (or Earendel) – most distant star detected (March, 2022)

References

External links 

 Images of first SN Refsdal in March and reappeared in December 2015 at hubblesite.org
 NASA’s Hubble Discovers Four Images of Same Supernova Split by Cosmic Lens - by NASA
 Predicted Reappearance of SN Refsdal (March 2015)
 The image taken by Hubble around November 2015 shows new supernovae 'SX' in multiply image system at astro.berkeley.edu.
 Hubble Hangout December 17 2015 discussing SN Refsdal
 View of Exploding Star Appears, Right on Cue National Geographic Society 17 December 2015

Supernovae
Gravitational lensing
Leo (constellation)